Molodizhne may refer to several places in Ukraine:

Molodizhne, Simferopol Raion, Crimea
Molodizhne, Popasna Raion, Luhansk Oblast
Molodizhne, Kirovohrad Oblast
Molodizhne, Donetsk Oblast